Arthur Lee Hunnicutt (February 17, 1910 – September 26, 1979) was an American actor known for his portrayal of wise, grizzled, and old rural characters. He received an Academy Award nomination for Best Supporting Actor for his performance in The Big Sky (1952). He was also known for his role in the Western television series Sugarfoot (1957–1961).

Early life and education
On February 17, 1910, Hunnicutt was born in Gravelly, Arkansas. He attended the University of Central Arkansas and Arkansas State Teachers College, but dropped out when he ran out of money.

Career 
Hunnicutt gained early acting experience in stock theatre and entertained in traveling shows. An article in the September 22, 1940, issue of the Brooklyn Daily Eagle reported "There isn't a decent sized medicine show traveling through Kentucky, Illinois, Georgia, Indiana or Mississippi, nor a stock company touring those states, which hasn't had the name of Arthur Hunnicutt on its programs." After eight years of such activity, in 1936 he enrolled in a drama school in Cleveland to study theatrical techniques for a year.

He moved to Martha's Vineyard, Massachusetts, where he joined up with a theatre company. Moving to New York City, he worked in the laundry at the Algonquin Hotel for 17 months, then landed roles in Broadway productions. While touring as the lead actor in Tobacco Road, he developed the country character he would later be typecast as throughout his career. Hunnicutt often found himself cast as a character much older than himself.

Hunnicutt's first film was Wildcat (1942). He appeared in a number of films in the early 1940s, then returned to the stage. In 1949, returned to Hollywood and resumed his film career. He played a long string of supporting roles—sympathetic, wise rural types, as in The Red Badge of Courage (1951), The Lusty Men (1952),The Kettles in the Ozarks (1955), The Last Command (1955, as Davy Crockett), The Tall T (1957), Cat Ballou (1965, as Butch Cassidy), El Dorado (1966) and The Adventures of Bullwhip Griffin.

In 1952, he was nominated for an Academy Award for Best Supporting Actor in the Howard Hawks film The Big Sky.

Throughout the 1950s, 1960s and 1970s, Hunnicutt made nearly 40 guest appearances on American television programs. He made two memorable appearances on Perry Mason in 1963: He played orange grower Amos Kennesaw Mountain Keller in "The Case of the Golden Oranges" and prospector Sandy Bowen in "The Case of the Drowsy Mosquito." He also made guest appearances on Bonanza, Cheyenne, Gunsmoke, The Outer Limits, The Rifleman, Wanted: Dead or Alive, The Andy Griffith Show, The Wild Wild West,  Adam-12, and The Twilight Zone. In Moonrunners (1975), one of his later movies and the precursor to The Dukes of Hazzard, he played the original Uncle Jesse.

In his later years, Hunnicutt served as honorary mayor of Northridge, California. He developed tongue cancer.

Death 
On September 27, 1979, Hunnicutt died of cancer at the Motion Picture & Television Country House and Hospital at age 69. He was buried in the Coop Prairie Cemetery in Mansfield, Arkansas.

Filmography

References

External links

 
 
 Arthur Lee Hunnicutt at Find a Grave

1910 births
1979 deaths
20th-century American male actors
Deaths from cancer in California
Deaths from oral cancer
Male actors from Arkansas
People from Yell County, Arkansas